Vladimir Kuznetsov (born 13 May 1945) is a former Soviet cyclist. He competed at the 1968 Summer Olympics and the 1972 Summer Olympics.

References

External links
 

1945 births
Living people
Soviet male cyclists
Olympic cyclists of the Soviet Union
Cyclists at the 1968 Summer Olympics
Cyclists at the 1972 Summer Olympics
Cyclists from Moscow